Shakhdara Range is a mountain range in Tajikistan, part of the Pamir Mountain System. 

The range lies in the extreme south-western Pamir in Tajikistan's Gorno-Badakhshan Autonomous Province. It runs roughly in the east–west direction between the Shakhdara River to the north with DarshayDara, IShkashim and Panj on the border with Afghanistan to the south, separating the watersheds of both rivers and rising toward Mayakovskiy Peak (6,096 m) in the west and Karl Marx Peak (6,726 m) in the east. Other high peaks of the range are Tajikistan Peak (6,565 m) and Engels Peak (6,510 m).

The range takes its name (in both English and Russian) from the Shakhdara River, and is sometimes erroneously called Shakhdarin Range (or Shakhdarin Mountains), a corruption of the Russian name.

See also
Roshtqal'a district

References

Mountain ranges of Tajikistan
Gorno-Badakhshan Autonomous Region
Pamir Mountains